Kollu may refer to:
Kollu, Dashkasan, Azerbaijan
Kollu, Gadabay, Azerbaijan